Mr. Lover Lover: The Best of Shaggy...Part 1 is the first compilation album released by the Jamaican singer Shaggy. The album includes material from Shaggy's first five studio albums, as well as the new recording, "Get Up, Stand Up".

Background
Origins for the album date back to March 1999, as some sites report that an album, entitled the Ultimate Shaggy Collection, was released on March 23, 1999. The album included material from Shaggy's first four studio albums, as well as the original version of "Luv Me, Luv Me", which featured Janet Jackson, and three brand new songs - "The Reggae Virus", featuring Mad Lion and KRS One, "True Dat" and "Hot Gal". However, no copies of the album ever appear to have been released.

In January 2002, Mr. Lover Lover, a similar compilation, was announced for release in both Europe and America. However, despite carrying artwork stating the title Mr. Lover Lover, some American sites listed the compilation under the title Ultimate Shaggy Collection. According to Amazon.com, the American version of Mr. Lover Lover was once again intended to include material from Shaggy's first four albums, the original version of "Luv Me, Luv Me", and three brand new tracks - "The Reggae Virus", "Better Not Be" and "Hot Gal". The European version did not include these three brand new tracks. However, when the album was released on January 29, 2002, both the European and American versions of the album had an identical track listing, neither containing the three brand new tracks.

Since the release of Mr. Lover Lover, all listings of the original Ultimate Shaggy Collection released in 1999, have included the artwork from the American version of Mr. Lover Lover. As far as can be seen, only one issue of the album was ever released - with the track listing below - and neither the Ultimate Shaggy Collection nor the American special issue of Mr. Lover Lover were ever released. The album entered the top 10 on the UK Albums Chart. On March 24, 2003, Mr. Lover Lover was reissued under the title The Essential Shaggy. The track listing did not differ.

Track listing
 "Boombastic" (Sting Remix) (from Boombastic) 
 "In the Summertime" (featuring Rayvon) (from Boombastic) 
 "Oh Carolina" (from Pure Pleasure) 
 "Luv Me, Luv Me" (featuring Janet Jackson) (from How Stella Got Her Groove Back) 
 "Nice and Lovely" (from Pure Pleasure) 
 "The Train Is Coming" (featuring Ken Boothe) (from Boombastic) 
 "Why You Treat Me So Bad" (featuring Grand Puba) (from Boombastic) 
 "Big Up" (featuring Rayvon) (from Pure Pleasure) 
 "Piece of My Heart" (featuring Marsha) (from Midnite Lover) 
 "Sexy Body Girls" (from Midnite Lover) 
 "Something Different" (featuring Wayne Wonder) (from Boombastic) 
 "That Girl" (featuring Maxi Priest and Rayvon) (from Man with the Fun) 
 "Get Up, Stand Up"
 "Boombastic" (from Boombastic)

Unreleased album track listings
 Ultimate Shaggy Collection (1999)
 "True Dat"
 "Luv Me, Luv Me" (featuring Janet Jackson)
 "The Reggae Virus"
 "That Girl" (featuring Maxi Priest)
 "In the Summertime" (featuring Rayvon)
 "Boombastic" [Sting Remix]
 "Oh Carolina"
 "Big Up" (featuring Rayvon)
 "Nice and Lovely" (featuring Rayvon)
 "Why You Treat Me So Bad?" (featuring Grand Puba)
 "Hot Gal"
 "Piece of My Heart" (featuring Marsha)
 "The Train Is Coming" (featuring Ken Boothe)
 "Something Different" [Hip Hop Remix] (featuring Wayne Wonder)
 "Perfect Song" (featuring Maxi Priest)
 "Think Ah So It Go"

 Mr. Lover Lover - American issue (2002)
 "Boombastic" (Sting Remix) 
 "In the Summertime" (featuring Rayvon) 
 "Oh Carolina" 
 "Nice And Lovely" 
 "The Train Is Coming" (featuring Ken Boothe)> 
 "Why You Treat Me So Bad" (featuring Grand Puba)  
 "Big Up" (featuring Rayvon)
 "Piece of My Heart" (featuring Marsha)
 "Luv Me, Luv Me" (featuring Janet Jackson)
 "The Reggae Virus" 
 "Sexy Body Girls" 
 "Something Different" (featuring Wayne Wonder) 
 "That Girl" (featuring Maxi Priest and Rayvon)
 "Better Not Be"
 "Hot Gal"
 "Boombastic"
 "Get Up, Stand Up"

Year-end charts

Certifications

References

Shaggy (musician) albums
1999 greatest hits albums
2002 greatest hits albums
2003 greatest hits albums